The 1916 Utah Agricultural Aggies football team was an American football team that represented Utah Agricultural College (later renamed Utah State University) in the Rocky Mountain Conference (RMC) during the 1916 college football season. In their first season under head coach Jack Watson, the Aggies compiled a 1–5–1 record (0–4 against RMC opponents) and were outscored by a total of 178 to 69.

Schedule

References

Utah Agricultural
Utah State Aggies football seasons
Utah State Aggies football